Joseph Shackford Johnston was the first president of Virginia Wesleyan College.

Education
Johnston received a bachelor's degree from the University of Virginia, a master's degree in divinity from Yale University, and he received an honorary doctorate of divinity from Randolph-Macon College.

Presidency of Virginia Wesleyan College
Johnston was a prominent figure in helping to procure the charter for Virginia Wesleyan College in 1961. Johnston was elected the first president of Virginia Wesleyan College in 1965 after serving as the primary advocate for the development and establishment of the institution.

Personal life
Joseph Shackford Johnston was married to Edna Cralle' Sanders Johnston in 1936, and together they had three children, daughters Anne J. Owen and Ginger Philbrick, and son Joe Johnston.

Johnston served as the minister in the Methodist Church through most of Virginia. In 1959 he was named the District Superintendent of the Norfolk District of the Methodist Church. Following his appointment as Superintendent, Johnston then began to get involved in the development of Virginia Wesleyan.

References

1910 births
2004 deaths
Virginia Wesleyan University
Heads of universities and colleges in the United States
University of Virginia alumni
Yale University alumni
20th-century American academics